Denis Joseph Savard (born February 4, 1961) is a Canadian former professional ice hockey player. He played in the National Hockey League (NHL) from 1980 to 1997, and was elected to the Hockey Hall of Fame in 2000. In 2017 Savard was named one of the '100 Greatest NHL Players' in history. Savard was drafted by the Chicago Blackhawks and became the forefront of the team during the 1980s. He led the Blackhawks to the Conference Finals four times, losing each time, twice being to Gretzky's Edmonton Oilers. Savard is known for the spin' o rama move, a tactic in Hockey used to create distance between the puck carrier and opponent. Savard won one Stanley Cup with the Montreal Canadiens in 1993. Savard also played with the Tampa Bay Lighting for two seasons before returning to the Chicago Blackhawks in 1994, and then retiring there in 1997. He has also served as head coach of the Chicago Blackhawks of the NHL, and now serves as an ambassador for the Blackhawks' organization. Savard was born in Gatineau, Quebec, but grew up in Montreal.

NHL playing career
As a youth, Savard played in the 1973 and 1974 Quebec International Pee-Wee Hockey Tournaments with a minor ice hockey team from Verdun, Quebec.

For the  1980 NHL Entry Draft, the Montreal Canadiens held the first overall pick and many fans hoped the Canadiens would use it to draft Savard. Instead, the Canadiens drafted Doug Wickenheiser and Savard was chosen third overall by the Chicago Blackhawks. He was the highest drafted player in Blackhawks' history, until the organization drafted Patrick Kane with the first overall pick in 2007. He began his career during the 1980–81 NHL season in which he had three assists in his first game. He then went on to set the Blackhawks' record (since broken) for most points by a rookie with 75.

He was known for his trademark move, the 'Savardian Spin-o-rama' (a term actually coined by Danny Gallivan, referencing the move performed by Serge Savard), which entailed Savard whirling around with the puck in a full rotation allowing him to defeat defenders and goaltenders alike.

Savard had two separate stints with the Blackhawks. The first was from the 1980–81 season to the 1989–90 season. The second was from 1994–95 to 1996–97. During his absence from Chicago, he played for the Montreal Canadiens (1990–91 to 1992–93) and the Tampa Bay Lightning (1993–94 to 1994–95).

On June 29, 1990, Savard was infamously traded to the Montreal Canadiens for star defenceman Chris Chelios and a second-round pick (Mike Pomichter), a transaction that has since been considered largely in Chicago's favor as Chelios would produce some of his best seasons as a Blackhawk while Savard's career was on the decline. Savard won the Stanley Cup with the Canadiens in 1993, although Savard was kept out of much of the postseason due to a hairline fracture in his ankle, and was essentially an assistant coach by the clinching game five.

He signed as a free agent with the Tampa Bay Lightning in the summer of 1993, where he played a season and a half. On April 6, 1995, Savard was traded back to Chicago, for a 1996 sixth-round pick (Xavier Delisle). Savard's NHL career would end where it had started, with the Blackhawks.

In 1,196 NHL games, Savard scored 473 goals and 865 assists, totalling 1338 points. He trails only Bobby Hull and Stan Mikita for total points in Chicago Blackhawks history. Five times during his career he scored at least 100 points and for seven straight years he had at least 30 goals. His highest point total of 131 came in 1987–88 and his highest goal total of 47 came in 1985–86. In 169 playoff games, he scored 66 goals and 109 assists for a total of 175 points.

Savard officially retired from professional hockey on June 26, 1997.  On March 19, 1998, the Blackhawks retired his jersey number #18. Savard was inducted into the Hockey Hall of Fame on November 13, 2000.

Awards
Stanley Cup champion: 1993
Selected to nine NHL All-Star Games: 1982, 1983, 1984, 1986, 1988, 1989, 1990, 1991, 1996
NHL Second All-Star Team: 1983

NHL Accolades
 #24 All Time in Career Assists (865) - "Regular Season"
 #29 All Time in Career Points (1338) - "Regular Season"
 #19 All Time in Career Assists Per Game Average (0.72) "Regular Season"
 #20 All Time in Career Points Per Game Average (1.12) "Regular Season"
 #19 All Time in Career Playoff Goals (66)
 #18 All Time in Career Playoff Assists (109)
 #16 All Time in Career Playoff Points (175)
 #9 All Time in Career Playoff Hat Tricks (3)
12 Regular Season Hat Tricks
3 Playoff Hat Tricks
4 time Hart Trophy Nominee (1981–82) (1982–83) (1983–84) (1987–88)

(Regular Season)
 5 times Top 10 in Points (1981–82) (1982–83) (1984–85) (1985–86) (1987–88)
 5 times Top 10 in Assists (1981–82) (1982–83) (1984–85) (1984–85) (1985–86) (1987–88)
 1 time Top 10 in Goals (1985–86)
 2 times Top 10 in Even Strength Goals (1985–86) (1986–87)
 2 times Top 10 in Shorthanded Goals (1987–88) (1988–89)
 2 times Top 10 in Game Winning Goals (1985–86) (1986–87)
 2 times Top 5 in Hat Tricks (1984–85) (1986–87)
 4 times Top 10 in Goals Created (1981–82) (1982–83) (1985–86) (1987–88)
 7 times Top 10 in Assists Per Game (1981–82) (1982–83) (1984–85) (1985–86) (1987–88) (1988–89) (1989–90)
 4 times Top 5 in Assists Per Game Average (1981–82) (1982–83) (1987–88) (1988–89)
 7 times Top 10 in Points Per Game Average (1981–82) (1982–83) (1985–86) (1986–87) (1987–88) (1988–89) (1989–90)
 2 times Top 3 in Points Per Game Average (1982–83) (1987–88)

(Playoffs)
 5 times Top 10 in Points (1982) (1983) (1985) (1989) (1995)
 3 times Top 10 in Assists (1985) (1989) (1995)
 5 times Top 10 in Points (1982) (1985) (1989) (1990) (1995)
 3 times Top 10 in Goals Per Game Average (1982) (1983) (1985)
 1 time Top 10 in Assists Per Game Average (1985) 
 2 times Top 10 in Points Per Game Average (1985) (1995)
 5 times Top 10 in Goals Created Per Game (1982) (1983) (1985) (1989) (1995)

Career statistics

Coaching career
Shortly after his retirement as a player, Savard began a coaching career with the Blackhawks in December 1997.  On November 27, 2006, Savard was named interim head coach of the Chicago Blackhawks after Trent Yawney was fired mid-season. He was commended for leading a young Blackhawks team to within 3 points of a playoff berth during his second season as coach.  The Hawks finished just one victory away from the .500 mark in 2007–2008. The 40 wins in 2007–08 marked the first time the club had reached the 40 win mark in six years.

On October 16, 2008, just four games into the season Savard was fired as coach of the Chicago Blackhawks. He was replaced by former Colorado Avalanche coach Joel Quenneville, who had been hired as a scout for the Blackhawks during the previous summer. In 147 games as coach, Savard posted a 65–66–16 record. Savard remains as an ambassador for the Blackhawks and received Stanley Cup rings in 2010, 2013 and 2015.

Coaching record

Personal life
Savard has a cousin named Jean Savard who also played for the Chicago Blackhawks in the 1970s. He also shared the same number as Serge Savard, who is unrelated to him. They shared the same number (#18), and in the 1990s Serge was general manager of the Habs when he acquired Denis from the Blackhawks.

Savard is sometimes called "Savoir-Faire" referring to a fictional French Canadian mouse that was the archnemesis of the cartoon character Klondike Kat.

See also
 List of members of the Hockey Hall of Fame
 List of NHL statistical leaders
 List of NHL players with 1000 points

References

"One on One with Serge Savard" by Kevin Shea, December 16, 2003, retrieved August 10, 2006
Hockey draft central

External links
 

1961 births
Canadian ice hockey centres
Canadian ice hockey coaches
Chicago Blackhawks captains
Chicago Blackhawks coaches
Chicago Blackhawks draft picks
Chicago Blackhawks players
Hockey Hall of Fame inductees
Ice hockey people from Montreal
Living people
Montreal Canadiens players
Montreal Juniors players
National Hockey League All-Stars
National Hockey League first-round draft picks
National Hockey League players with retired numbers
Ice hockey people from Gatineau
Stanley Cup champions
Tampa Bay Lightning players